Hungary's Got Talent is the Hungarian version of the Got Talent franchise, broadcast from 10 October 2015 on RTL Klub.

The original judging panel consisted of Márkó Lincényi, Patrícia Kovács, Eszter Horgas and Imre Csuja. The show was originally hosted by Balázs Sebestyén and István Dombóvári.

There has been one winner of the show to date: Dirty Led Light Crew.

The show consists of auditions, three semi-finals and a final. Participants can sign up for the program from the age of 4 without any genre binding to any event.

During the selections, there are four red buttons and one golden buzzer on the jury's table. The jury members may press the red button during any performance. If a competitor is rewarded with a red button by all four jury members, then the competition ends. The golden buzzer can only be pressed once by each jury member once a year, and once by the presenters. The five competitors who get the golden buzzer automatically go to the final. The winning prize is 12 million huf.

Series summary

Ratings

Live television series
Got Talent
Hungarian television shows
2015 Hungarian television series debuts
2015 Hungarian television series endings
Hungarian television series based on British television series
RTL (Hungarian TV channel) original programming